The Sakuye are a clan of the Oromo people living in Marsabit, Tana River, Garissa, Wajir, Mandera and Isiolo Counties, Northern Frontier District Region, now Northern Kenya.

The 1979 Kenyan census reported this group had 1,824 persons, but Günther Schlee believes this number "is definitely too low". The 1969 census gave 4,369 as their number, and the apparent decrease is not due to biological factors. In the 2019 census, they numbered 47,006. Because of their language and their inter-locking settlements, many Sakuye must have given 'Boran' when asked for their 'tribe'

According to Ethnologue, Sakuye is a dialect of the Afaan Borana language, though it has some significant differences. Their name comes from the name of one of the traditional divisions of Borana territory, Saaku, which is the area north of Marsabit. Thus, Saaku-ye means "from Saaku" or "of Saaku" in Afaan Booranaa. When a group of Rendille moved north from Marsabit, their Borana neighbors referred to them as the "Saakuye".

History 
The Sakuye are Muslims Sunni Islam. Following Kenyan independence, the Sakuye joined their Somali Cousins Somalis in Northern Frontier District Region now Northern Kenya in their attempt to secede and join the Somali Republic. Most of their livestock was killed by government forces during the Shifta War (1963–1967), reducing many Sakuye to poverty. In the 1970s, a group of Sakuye moved to the Dabel hills, which lie below the Ethiopian plateau. The traditional camel-oriented rituals, with a nominal Muslim affiliation, became much less important after the destruction of the herds and the Sakuye became Husayniyya, followers of the Sufi order founded by Sheikh Hussein whose tomb lies in the village named for him in Bale, Ethiopia. Today the Sakuye population is divided between those in Dabel and those in Isiolo.

Notes and references 

Languages of Kenya